Charlotte Randall (born Dunedin) is a New Zealand novelist.
Her first novel, Dead Sea Fruit won the Reed Fiction Award, and the 1996 Commonwealth Writers' Prize, Best First Book, South East Asia / Pacific.

She studied psychology at the University of Canterbury. 
She was the 2000 Victoria University Writers' Fellow, and was the 2005 Ursula Bethell Creative Writing Resident, at Canterbury University. 
She teaches at New Zealand's Writers College. 
She is married  with  two children.

Works
Dead Sea Fruit Secker & Warburg, 1995, 
The Curative, Penguin Books, 2000, 
Within the Kiss, Penguin, 2002, 
What Happen Then, Mr Bones?, Penguin Books, 2004, 
The Crocus Hour, Penguin Books, 2008, 
Hokitika Town, Penguin Group New Zealand, Limited, 2011, 
The Bright Side of My Condition, Penguin New Zealand, 2013,

References

External links
charlotte randall's version of punk, October 6, 2008
"Charlotte Randall", New Zealand Literature File

New Zealand women novelists
Writers from Dunedin
University of Canterbury alumni
Living people
20th-century New Zealand novelists
21st-century New Zealand novelists
21st-century New Zealand women writers
20th-century New Zealand women writers
Year of birth missing (living people)